Daniele Bracciali and Oliver Marach won the title, beating Marin Draganja and Mate Pavić 6–3, 2–6, [11–9]

Seeds

Draw

Draw

References

 Main Draw

AON Open Challenger - Doubles
2013 Doubles
AON